SM UC-41 was a German Type UC II minelaying submarine or U-boat in the German Imperial Navy during World War I. The U-boat was ordered on 20 November 1915 and was launched on 13 September 1916. She was commissioned into the German Imperial Navy on 11 October 1916 as SM UC-41.

In a nine-month career that encompassed seven patrols UC-41 was credited with sinking 18 ships totaling 19,475 GRT, either by torpedo or by mines laid. The writer David Masters attributed the sinking of the two tiny naval fishing smacks Nelson and Ethel & Millie to UC-41 during an engagement on 15 August 1917. However this was actually UC-63, the logs of which record the event.

UC-41 was lost on 21 August 1917 after suffering an unexplained internal explosion of one of her mines which forced her to suddenly rise to the surface in the Tay estuary, where she was spotted by British naval trawlers and depth charged, killing all 27 German sailors and possibly seven British prisoners of war as well. Her wreck was rediscovered in 2003.

Design
A German Type UC II submarine, UC-41 had a displacement of  when at the surface and  while submerged. The submarine was powered by two six-cylinder four-stroke diesel engines each producing  (a total of ), two electric motors producing , and two propeller shafts.

UC-41 was fitted with six  mine tubes, eighteen UC 200 mines, three  torpedo tubes (one on the stern and two on the bow), seven torpedoes, and one  Uk L/30 deck gun. Her complement was twenty-six crew members.

Summary of raiding history

References

Notes

Citations

Bibliography

 
 

 

Ships built in Hamburg
German Type UC II submarines
U-boats commissioned in 1916
Maritime incidents in 1917
U-boats sunk in 1917
U-boats sunk by mines
U-boats sunk by British warships
World War I minelayers of Germany
World War I shipwrecks in the North Sea
World War I submarines of Germany
1916 ships
Ships lost with all hands